Muhammad Bahtiar Ude (born 26 November 1987) is an Indonesian professional footballer who plays as a central midfielder for Liga 3 club Serpong City. He previously played for Persiba Balikpapan.

International career
In 2007, he played to represent the Indonesia U-23, in 2007 SEA Games.

Honours

Club 
Mitra Kukar
 General Sudirman Cup: 2015

References

External links
 Muhammad Bahtiar at Soccerway
 Muhammad Bahtiar at Liga Indonesia

Indonesian footballers
Persiba Balikpapan players
Living people
1987 births
Association football midfielders